Shieldhill Castle is a category B listed building located near Biggar in South Lanarkshire. The building dates back to 1199 and is currently being run as Shieldhill Castle Hotel.

Reported hauntings
A grey lady ghost has been sighted by hotel guests in the corridors of the building. One belief is she was a former occupant of the house who fell for someone of a lower social class. The story goes that she killed herself as a result of her father forbidding their relationship. Additionally a male ghost clothed in a what appears to be butler's uniform has been reported in the hotel's former staff quarters.

Ownership
The Chancellor family resided in the castle for over 750 years. After being sold by the family it was turned into a hotel in 1959.

References

External links

Castles in South Lanarkshire
Category B listed buildings in South Lanarkshire
Reportedly haunted locations in Scotland
Hotels in South Lanarkshire
Hotels established in 1959
Buildings and structures completed in 1199
1190s establishments in Scotland
1959 establishments in Scotland